Lila Art High School (previously known as Lila Computer High School) is a high school in South Korea. Originally founded in 1952 by Kwon Eungpal  as a vocational boy's school, it changed its name to "Lila Industrial High School" in 1992, "Lila Computer High School" in 2000, and finally "Lila Art High School" in 2009.

The school seeks to maximize the students' individuality and creativity and nurture the foundation of lifelong happiness. This is broken up into three pillars: diligence, love and creation.

This private school is located in Jung-gu, Seoul and house 385 students (163 male, 222 female) and 48 faculty (26 male, 22 female).

Departments 
Department of Computer Media
Digital Sound Content Division
Department of Health Science 
Department of Visual and Music Contents 
Theater & Acting (Applied Music) 
 Sports Management

Notable alumni 

 Bae Jin-young
 Park Ji-yeon 
 Park Sun-young (aka "Luna") 
 Woo Hye-rim

References

External links

 Official website 

Educational institutions established in 1952
High schools in Seoul
Art schools in South Korea
1952 establishments in South Korea